The peruvian district of Punta Negra is one of the 43 districts of the Province of Lima. It borders the district of Punta Hermosa to the north, the Province of Huarochirí to the east, the district of San Bartolo to the south, and the Pacific Ocean to the west.

History
In precolombian times, the area of the current district was inhabited by coastal fishermen of the Yungas people, and was under the hegemony of the rulers of Pachacamac, and later the Incas. Post-conquest, the area was known as Tropezon, until passage of the Law Nº 12096 created the modern district of Punta Negra on 7 April 1954. Its name is attributed to an Italo-Peruvian citizen named Lidio Mongilardi, who upon visiting the area for the first time reportedly compared it to a coastal zone in Italy known as Punta Negra. As a popular beach destination, various Peruvian social clubs have beach venues in this district, the most notable being the Country Club El Bosque and the Club Social y Deportes Punta Negra. In 2019, Punta Rocas was one of the venues of the 2019 Pan American Games.

Geography
The district has an area of 130.5 km2, most of which is uninhabited desert. It is estimated to have more than 8,000 permanent residents, and 11,000 during the summer beach season. The district has several beaches, including Cangrejos, Punta Rocas, El Puerto, La Pocita, La Bikini, El Revés, Santa Rosa and Peñascal. A highlight is the Quebrada de Cruz de Hueso, whose mouth can be found on Peñascal beach.

Government
The municipal council is responsible for taxes and regulations, and includes a mayor and local councilors

Local politicians 
Mayors of Punta Negra
 2011–2014
 Mayor: Francisco Buitrón Huapaya, Willington Robespierre Ojeda Guerra, Siempre Unidos Party (SU).
 Local Councillors:

Religious organization 
 Parish
 Parish Priest: Padre Félix.

Festividades 
 Club Punta Negra:
 January: New Year's Celebration
 February: Kermesse, Luau Party
 March: Carnival
 December: Start of Season Lunch
 March: Feast of Saint Joseph
 June: Feast of Saint Peter.

Urban landmarks
Several Peruvian country clubs have their main location in this district, including Country Club El Bosque  Club Social y Deportes Punta Negra.

See also 
 Cono Sur
Punta Hermosa
 San Bartolo
 Santa María del Mar
Ancón
Santa Rosa
Asia

References

External links 

 Municipalidad Distrital de Punta Negra
 Playas

Districts of Lima